Thomas Jefferson High School is a public high school located in the heart of the Westshore Business District of Tampa, Florida, United States. It is an Area 1 school under the Hillsborough County Public School system.

History
In 1939, due to the increasing high school population in the Tampa area, Thomas Jefferson High School was founded in the Old Hillsborough County High School building at 2704 N. Highland Avenue in the city's Tampa Heights neighborhood.  Named after the third president of the United States, Thomas Jefferson, its first principal was D.W. Waters and its first class graduated in 1942. By 1967, the school board decided that its location no longer met modern educational requirements and the first Jefferson High School was closed. Upon closure of the school, students were sent to neighboring schools to complete their education. The original Thomas Jefferson High School building still exists today as the D.W. Waters Career Center.

On August 27, 1973 the new Jefferson High School building was opened at its current location on West Cypress Street.

Demographics
Jefferson HS is 53% Hispanic, 34% Black, 9% White, and 4% other

Magnet Program
In 2001 Thomas Jefferson High instituted a magnet program with courses focusing on international studies.
International Business & Global Finance Honors
International Culinary Arts Honors
International Law & Criminal Justice Honors
Maritime academy

The courses have since changed names and have slowly moved on from focusing on international studies to being college preparatory leadership academies for students.

Thomas Jefferson High School offers the following College Preparatory Leadership Academies to magnet students who apply:

Business and Finance Leadership Academy
Law and Criminal Justice Leadership Academy
Culinary Arts Leadership Academy
Maritime and Marine Environmental Science Leadership Academy

Athletics

Football
In 2010, the Dragons won the Class 3A State Championship.  They finished the year 15-0 and ranked #8 nationally

Music
The Music programs offered at Jefferson High School are:

Marching Band
Winter Guard
Jazz Band
Symphonic Band
Percussion Ensemble
Orchestra

Extracurricular activities
Jefferson High students participate in clubs, groups, and organizations.
 Honors clubs
Beta, Mu Alpha Theta, National Honor Society, National Technical Honor Society, French Honor Society, Spanish Honor Society, German Honor Society, Thespians Tri-M National Music Honor Society.

 Magnet clubs

DECA, FBLA, FCCLA, FPSA (Florida Public Service Association), Tri-M Music Honor Society, Mock Trial Team

 Service clubs
Junior Civitan, Key Club, SAC (student advisory council), SADD, Shanti.

 Interest clubs
Arriba, Ballroom Dancing, FCA, True Love Does Wait, Nubian Queens, Science Brain Bowl, YO, Model United Nations, Human Rights, Step,  Male/Female Weightlifting, Hip-Hop, Crew, Best Buddies, Drama, Health Club.

 Additional
 school newspaper, literary magazine, yearbook.

Notable alumni
 Coleman Bell NFL football player 
 Ventell Bryant NFL wide receiver
 Andre Caldwell NFL football player 
 Reche Caldwell NFL football player 
 Rick Casares NFL football player 
 Kirby Dar Dar NFL football player 
 André Davis NFL wide receiver
 Luis Gonzalez Major League Baseball player
 Jimmy Herget Major League Baseball player
 Tarence Kinsey NBA Basketball player, currently plays for Hapoel Jerusalem of the Israeli Premier League 
 Joe Lala musician and actor
 Fred McGriff Major League Baseball player 
 Chris Moore NFL wide receiver
 Ferdie Pacheco Physician for Muhammad Ali
 Tony La Russa Major League Baseball player/manager 
 Bob Martinez former Tampa mayor and Florida governor
 Tino Martinez Major League Baseball player
 Keith Newman NFL football player 
 Prechae Rodriguez NFL football player
 Lenny Faedo, Major League Baseball player 
 Sam Militello, Major League Baseball player 
 Al Pardo, Major League Baseball player 
 Fred Rath, Jr., Major League Baseball player
 Torrance Small, NFL football player 
 Oscar Smith NFL football player 
 K. D. Williams NFL football player 
 Ramik Wilson NFL Linebacker 
 Tony Zappone author, photojournalist, broadcaster

References

External links
Official website
Hillsborough County Public School information
Jefferson High School Band
Jefferson High School baseball
Jefferson High Sports
Jefferson sports
School Accountability report

High schools in Tampa, Florida
Public high schools in Florida
1939 establishments in Florida
Educational institutions established in 1939